The Olkaria I Geothermal Power Station, also known as Olkaria I Geothermal Power Plant is a geothermal power station in Kenya, with an installed capacity of .

Location
The facility is located in the Hell's Gate National Park along with its sister stations, Olkaria II and Olkaria III.

Overview
Olkaria I Geothermal Power Station is one in a series of six geothermal power stations, clustered in the Olkaria area in Nakuru County. Four of the stations Olkaria I, Olkaria II, Olkaria III and Olkaria IV were operational, as of September 2017. Olkaria V is under construction and Olkaria VI is planned for 2021.

History
The Olkaria I Power Station first started operation in 1981 running one Mitsubishi turbine with a generation capacity of 15MW. In 1982 and 1985, two more turbines identical to the first were commissioned at the facility, bringing the total generation capacity to 45MW. As of January 2015 unit 4 and 5 with a combined installed capacity of 140 Megawatts were inaugurated. This brings the total installed capacity of Olkaria I to 185 Megawatts.

In March 2016, the government of Kenya borrowed KSh9.53 billion (US$95 million), from the Japan International Cooperation Agency (JICA) to refurbish turbines 1, 2 and 3 at Olkaria I. The works includes increasing the combined capacity of the three turbines from 45MW to 50.7MW. The rehabilitation and upgrade works are expected to last until 2021.

In December 2018, Kenya Electricity Generating Company broke ground for the construction of Unit 6 of Olkaria I Geothermal Power Station, with capacity of 83 megawatts. Unit 6 of Olkaria I, was commercially commissioned in July 2022.

Ownership
Olkaria I Power Station is owned by KenGen, a Nairobi Stock Exchange - listed company, in which the government of Kenya maintains 70 percent shareholding, the remaining 30 percent being held by institutional and private investors.

See also
List of power stations in Kenya
Geothermal power in Kenya
Olkaria II Geothermal Power Station
Olkaria III Geothermal Power Station
Olkaria IV Geothermal Power Station
Olkaria V Geothermal Power Station

References

External links
 Website of Kenya Electricity Generating Company
 Kenyatta Breaks Ground Construction of Olkaria 1 Unit 6 As of 4 December 2018.

1981 establishments in Kenya
Nakuru County
Geothermal power stations in Kenya
Energy infrastructure completed in 1981